Benidorm, that is known for its hotel industry, beaches and skyscrapers, is located at the southeastern edge of Spain 40 km from Alicante. This is the list of the tallest buildings in Benidorm. Since its final opening in 2021, the Intempo has been the tallest building. Benidorm is also known as Little Manhattan because of its tall buildings.

Following is a list of tallest buildings in Benidorm, Spain.

References

See also 
 http://seriouslyspain.com/benidorms-1960s-and-1970s-architecture-is-stunning-a-town-of-beautiful-buildings
 https://www.dezeen.com/tag/benidorm/
 https://www.independent.co.uk/news/world/europe/benidorms-towering-monument-to-spain-s-debt-disaster-a6775826.html
 https://www.telegraph.co.uk/travel/destinations/europe/spain/eastcoast/719565/Spain-Whats-so-brilliant-about-Benidorm.html

Note: All note is from Benidorm

Benidorm
Tallest